Nicola Hatefi Mofrad (born 9 January 1991) is a Belgian-Iranian footballer who currently plays for Léopold FC.

He began his professional career at S. du Pays de Charleroi.

International
Hatefi is a member of the Belgium national under-19 football team, but is also eligible for the Iran national football team via his parents.

References

External links

1991 births
Living people
Belgian footballers
Footballers from Brussels
People from Uccle
R. Charleroi S.C. players
Léopold FC players
Belgian Pro League players
Association football goalkeepers
Belgian people of Iranian descent
Sportspeople of Iranian descent
Belgium youth international footballers